The Tassili Mushroom Figure is a late Neolithic depiction of a bee-headed Shaman possibly partaking in the use of hallucinogens discovered in Tassili n'Ajjer. The figure is often cited as being the oldest known evidence of ritualistic mushroom use in prehistory.

Discovery 

The discovery of prehistoric rock art at the Tassili n'Ajjer archaeological site occurred throughout the 1910s, 1930s, and into the 1960s. The figure was found among other such depictions of mushroom use occurring in the area, including pictures of figures running under the influence. The figure is also of interest to scholars due to its anthropomorphic nature, similar to the lion-man and a group of 44,000-year-old rock paintings of animal-headed hunters discovered in Indonesia. Other hypotheses surrounding prehistoric hallucinations relating to art have emerged; for example, the possible role of hallucinations due to oxygen deprivation in cave art.

Gallery

References 

Prehistoric art
Prehistoric religion
Archaeological artifacts
Rock art in Africa
Archaeology of Algeria
Entheogens